Khalid Boutaïb (born 24 April 1987) is a professional footballer who plays as a striker for Ligue 2 club Paris. Born in France, he plays for the Morocco national team.

Club career
Born in Bagnols-sur-Cèze, Boutaïb started his career with spells at Bagnols Pont and Uzès, where he was part of the team that won promotion to the Championnat National in the 2011–12 season before joining Istres in the summer of 2012. Boutaïb made his professional debut in the 1–2 defeat to Clermont Foot in the Coupe de la Ligue on 7 August 2012, coming on as a half-time substitute for Ludovic Genest.

Boutaïb presents the particularity of being a gifted student as well. He obtained the maximal grade of 20/20 in mathematics in French High School exam. He chose however to continue his career as a football player.

Out of contract with Gazélec Ajaccio, Boutaïb joined Racing Strasbourg on a one-year contract.

Boutaïb signed with newly promoted Turkish Süper Lig side Yeni Malatyaspor in June 2017. In 2019, he joined Egyptian club Zamalek. In October 2020, Boutaïb returned to France to play for Le Havre.

On 31 January 2022, Boutaïb signed for Ligue 2 side Paris FC on a contract until June 2023.

International career
Boutaïb was born in France to parents of Moroccan descent. He announced his intention to represent Morocco at international level. He received a call-up to the Morocco national football team for 2017 Africa Cup of Nations qualification matches against Cape Verde, and made his debut as a late sub in a 1–0 win.

In May 2018 he was named in Morocco’s 23-man squad for the 2018 FIFA World Cup in Russia.

Personal life
Boutaïb is the uncle of the footballer Nassim Chadli.

Career statistics

International

International goals
Scores and results list Morocco's goal tally first.

Honours
Zamalek
 CAF Confederation Cup: 2018–19
Egypt Cup: 2018–19

References

External links

Khalid Boutaïb career statistics at foot-national.com

1987 births
Living people
French sportspeople of Moroccan descent
Citizens of Morocco through descent
People from Bagnols-sur-Cèze
Sportspeople from Gard
Association football forwards
French footballers
Moroccan footballers
Morocco international footballers
ES Uzès Pont du Gard players
FC Istres players
Luzenac AP players
Gazélec Ajaccio players
RC Strasbourg Alsace players
Yeni Malatyaspor footballers
Süper Lig players
Zamalek SC players
Le Havre AC players
Paris FC players
Ligue 1 players
Ligue 2 players
Championnat National players
Championnat National 2 players
Championnat National 3 players
Egyptian Premier League players
Expatriate footballers in Turkey
Expatriate footballers in Egypt
Moroccan expatriate sportspeople in Turkey
Moroccan expatriate sportspeople in Egypt
2017 Africa Cup of Nations players
2018 FIFA World Cup players
2019 Africa Cup of Nations players
Footballers from Occitania (administrative region)